Powdersville is a census-designated place (CDP) in Anderson County, South Carolina, United States. The population was 7,618 at the 2010 census, up from 5,362 in 2000. Powdersville was initially a farming community until the increase in housing subdivisions and businesses along Highway 153.

History
The name Powders comes from the production and trade of gunpowder in the area. One of the first stores in present-day Powdersville was called the Powdersville Area General Store. In 1859 a powder mill was established in present-day Powdersville by John Bowen. During the American Civil War the area was used to store gunpowder but Columbia was the primary site for the production of the state's powder. Due to the area's use of gunpowder the name Powders became a fixture for the location. The Saluda Valley-Powdersville Water Company was created in 1971 to serve drinking water to around 1,200 customers. In 1992 the name changed to Powdersville Water Company and in 2001 the name changed again to Powdersville Water District. The first high school in Powdersville was established in 2011 as Powdersville High School.

Geography
Powdersville is located in the northern corner of Anderson County at  (34.782620, -82.492138). Its northwest border is the Pickens County line, and its northeast border is the Saluda River, which forms the Greenville County line. The southeast border of the CDP is formed by Interstate 85, a six-lane highway with access to Powdersville via exits 39 and 40.

Demographics

2020 census

As of the 2020 United States census, there were 10,025 people, 3,515 households, and 2,570 families residing in the CDP.

2000 census
As of the census of 2000, there were 5,362 people, 1,989 households, and 1,615 families residing in the CDP. The population density was 384.4 people per square mile (148.4/km2). There were 2,133 housing units at an average density of 152.9/sq mi (59.0/km2). The racial makeup of the CDP was 94.18% White, 4.35% African American, 0.26% Native American, 0.37% Asian, 0.06% Pacific Islander, 0.21% from other races, and 0.58% from two or more races. Hispanic or Latino of any race were 1.14% of the population.

There were 1,989 households, out of which 37.4% had children under the age of 18 living with them, 69.8% were married couples living together, 8.2% had a female householder with no husband present, and 18.8% were non-families. 16.9% of all households were made up of individuals, and 5.6% had someone living alone who was 65 years of age or older. The average household size was 2.70 and the average family size was 3.01.

In the CDP, the population was spread out, with 26.0% under the age of 18, 7.0% from 18 to 24, 30.4% from 25 to 44, 27.2% from 45 to 64, and 9.4% who were 65 years of age or older. The median age was 38 years. For every 100 females, there were 95.8 males. For every 100 females age 18 and over, there were 96.1 males.

The median income for a household in the CDP was $50,255, and the median income for a family was $57,131. Males had a median income of $41,297 versus $25,136 for females. The per capita income for the CDP was $20,901. About 2.4% of families and 2.5% of the population were below the poverty line, including 1.1% of those under age 18 and 7.3% of those age 65 or over.

Religion
The largest religious group in Powdersville is Protestant. The oldest church congregation in Powdersville dating back to 1833 is Bethesda Church.

Education

Public education in Powdersville is administered by 	Anderson County School District One. The district operates Concrete Primary School, Powdersville Elementary School, Powdersville Middle School and Powdersville High School.

Powdersville has a public library, a branch of the Anderson County Library System.

Transportation

State Highways
  SC 153
  SC 81

Interstate

References

External links
 Powdersville.com, local information
 Powdersville Information Page at SCIway Site
 The Powdersville Post

Census-designated places in Anderson County, South Carolina
Census-designated places in South Carolina